Chad Horstman (born in 1978) is an American ecommerce entrepreneur. Horstman is currently working on three online ventures, most recently Greensupply, a mask and sanitizer provider, Greensupply has shipped over 600,000 masks and was not focused on profits in an effort to keep people safe early in the COVID-19 pandemic.  BasketballNews.com, which launched July 2020, is a stat focused NBA news site that has filled its staff with current and former NBA players and high profile writers. 3Wishes, an online costume and lingerie store, which was acquired and relaunched in 2019. He is the co-founder of Yandy.com, which he started in his garage with his brother, Evan Horstman, before selling the company to private equity firm SPK Capital.

Horstman is the creator of various "sexy" Halloween costumes and is often credited as the person that started the trend of making pop culture events into "sexy" costumes.  Some of his creations include Sexy Ken Bone, the famous undecided voter in the 2016 presidential election, Sexy Pizza Rat and Sexy Pizza which was featured by Jon Stewart on The Daily Show, Sexy Big Bird after Mitt Romney threatened to cut funding to PBS and #The Dress, after the viral blue and white dress image where people saw different colors.

Horstman actively supports Foundation Fighting Blindness and the Joy Bus, a local charitable organization that delivers meals to cancer patients.

Horstman graduated from Arizona State University and resides in Scottsdale, Arizona

References 

Living people
1978 births
Businesspeople from Arizona
Businesspeople from Phoenix, Arizona
Arizona State University alumni
21st-century American businesspeople